Marc Robert Favart (9 February 1911 – 26 July 2003) was a French actor, married to Jenny Carré, daughter of Albert Carré.

Filmography

Cinema 

1938:  (by Jean de Limur)
1939: Angelica or La rose de sang (by Jean Choux)
1941:  (by Yvan Noé) - a pilot
1941: Parade en sept nuits (by Marc Allégret) - Raymond (uncredited)
1942: Le Destin fabuleux de Désirée Clary (by Sacha Guitry) - Lannes
1943:  (by René Le Hénaff)
1943:  (by Émile Couzinet) - Don Fernand de Torilhas
1944: La Malibran (by Sacha Guitry) - Le ravisseur
1946: Strange Fate (by Louis Cuny) - Philipe - l'assistant du professeur
1948: Colonel Durand (by René Chanas) - Bertrand de Lormoy
1948:  (by Robert Hennion) - Dessanges
1948: The Lame Devil (by Sacha Guitry) - Abbé Dupanloup (uncredited)
1951: Sous le ciel de Paris (by Julien Duvivier) - Maximilien
1951:  (by Marcel Aboulker and Michel Ferry) (unfinished film)
1954: Royal Affairs in Versailles (by Sacha Guitry) - M. de Calènes (uncredited)
1955: Napoléon (by Sacha Guitry) - Count Otto
1955: Gentlemen Marry Brunettes (by Richard Sale) - Hotel manager
1956:  (by Dimitri Kirsanoff) - Prince Soliman Ben Salah
1964: Faites sauter la banque! (by Jean Girault) - the Italian colleague (uncredited)
1964: Coplan, agent secret FX-18 (by Maurice Cloche) - the Italian colonel
1964: De l'assassinat considéré comme un des beaux-arts (by Maurice Boutel)
1965: Le Majordome (by Jean Delannoy) - Maître Boissard
1965: Passeport diplomatique agent K8 (by Robert Vernay)
1965: Coplan FX 18 casse tout (by Riccardo Freda)
1966: Angelique and the King (by Bernard Borderie) - the surgeon
1966: Killer's Carnival (by Alberto Cardone, Sheldon Reynolds, Robert Lynn and Louis Soulanès) - Sergej (Vienna segment) (uncredited)
1966: Triple Cross (by Terence Young) - General Dalrymple
1967: The Night of the Generals (by Anatole Litvak) - the airport employee (uncredited)
1967: I Killed Rasputin (by Robert Hossein)
1967: Le Samourai (by Jean-Pierre Melville) - Le patron du bar
1970: Last Known Address (by José Giovanni) - the school principal
1970: The Mushroom (by Marc Simenon)
1970: Last Leap (by Édouard Luntz) - L'adjoint de Jauran
1970: Children of Mata Hari (by Jean Delannoy) - Le commissaire principal
1970: Le Cercle rouge (by Jean-Pierre Melville) - the salesman by Mauboussin
1971: Max et les Ferrailleurs (by Claude Sautet) - Loiselle
1971: La part des lions (by )
1971: The Widow Couderc (by Pierre Granier-Deferre)
1972: The Pebbles of Étretat (by Sergio Gobbi)
1973: The Woman in Blue (by Michel Deville) - Le premier automobiliste
1973:  (by Édouard Molinaro) - Ange
1973: Don Juan, or If Don Juan Were a Woman (by Roger Vadim)
1973:  (by Jean Yanne) - the Italian delegate
1973: The Day of the Jackal (by Fred Zinnemann) - Minister (uncredited)
1973: Le Mataf (by Serge Leroy)
1973: The Mad Adventures of Rabbi Jacob (by Gérard Oury) - Un invité au mariage (uncredited)
1974:  (by André Hunebelle) - M. de Tréville
1974: Chinese in Paris (by Jean Yanne) - Le collaborateur de Montaubert
1974: Paul and Michelle (Paul and Michelle) (by Lewis Gilbert) - the teacher
1974: Creezy (by Pierre Granier-Deferre)
1974:  (by André Hunebelle) - M. de Tréville
1974: Verdict (by André Cayatte) - Professor Chartier, Annie's father
1974: Hommes de joie pour femmes vicieuses (by Pierre Chevalier)
1975: Playing with Fire (by Alain Robbe Grillet) - the banquer
1975: Catherine et Compagnie (by Michel Boisrond)
1976: Scrambled Eggs (by Joël Santoni)
1981: La Pension des surdoués (by Pierre Chevalier) - Le père de la militante (uncredited)
1983:  (by Gabriel Aghion)

Television 

1970:  (by Claude Santelli) (Téléfilm) - the king fisher
1971: Les nouvelles aventures de Vidocq (TV serial) - the préfect of the Rhône
1972: Kean: Un roi de Théâtre (by Marcel Moussy) (Téléfilm) - Elliston
1973:  (by Frédéric Jacques Temple, Nino Frank and Philippe Agostini, directed by Philippe Agostini)
1973: Les rois maudits (TV serial) - the knight
1973:  (Série TV)
1973:  (Série TV) - La Bécotterie
1974: Une affaire à suivre (by Alain Boudet) (Téléfilm) - Cruchot
1978: Aurélien by Michel Favart (Téléfilm) - Maro Polo
1979: Un juge, un flic (Série TV) - Bortocelli
1980: La peau de chagrin (by Michel Favart) (Téléfilm) - Duke of Navarreins
1982: Adieu by Pierre Badel (Téléfilm) - General de Vandières
1986: Sins (Série TV) - Dr. Beaumais
1987: La nuit du coucou by Michel Favart (Téléfilm) - Man in the hall
1988: War and Remembrance (TV serial) - Count of Chambrun (final appearance)

Theater

Author 
1983: Madame… pas dame, directed by Marcelle Tassencourt, Théâtre Montansier

Comédian 
1941: Marché noir by Steve Passeur, directed by Camille Corney, théâtre Édouard VII
1942: L'Étoile de Séville by Lope de Vega, directed by Maurice Jacquemont, Comédie des Champs-Élysées
1944: Le Roi Christin by Marcelle Maurette, Théâtre Édouard VII
1948:  by Roger Dornès and Jean Marsan, directed by Alfred Pasquali, Comédie-Wagram
1967: La Maison des cœurs brisés by George Bernard Shaw, directed by Jean Tasso, Centre dramatique de l'Est

Theater director 

External links 
 

French male actors
1911 births
People from Alexandria
2003 deaths
French expatriates in Egypt